Against the Law is the fifth EP released by the American anarcho street punk band Defiance, released on the French label Dirty Punk in 2003.

Track listing 
A side
Fall Into Line – 3:35
Warfare – 3:08

B side
Does the System Work? – 5:02

Defiance (punk band) albums
2003 EPs